The City of London and Westminster South by-election on 24 February 1977 was held after Conservative Member of Parliament (MP) Christopher Tugendhat resigned the seat upon his appointment to the European Commission. A safe Conservative seat, it was won by their candidate, Peter Brooke.

Candidates
The election was contested by a record ten candidates, beating the nine who had contested the 1976 Walsall North by-election. This total was topped at the 1978 Lambeth Central by-election. The candidates were:

 Bill Boaks stood under the title "Air, Road, Public Safety, White Resident". Boaks was a road safety campaigner and serial by-election candidate.
 Peter Brooke, a graduate of Harvard Business School was the Conservative Party candidate.
 Dennis Delderfield was the candidate for the New Britain Party, of which he was founder and leader. Delderfield was also a common councilman of the Corporation of London.
 Ralph Herbert was an independent who stood under the title "Christ, Crown, Country, Commonwealth, Christian Constitution".
 Paul Kavanagh was the candidate for the National Front.
 Michael Lobb was the candidate for the National Party, a splinter group of the National Front. He was candidate for the National Front in Newham South in the February 1974 general election and the subsequent by-election in the same seat.
 Peter Mitchell stood under the banner "Pro-Homosexual Civil Rights". He was involved in the Campaign for Homosexual Equality pressure group.
 Malcolm Noble was the Labour Party candidate. 
 Angus Scrimgeour was the Liberal Party candidate. 
 William Thompson was an independent who stood under the title "Christian Outreach to Britain, Anti-Pornography".

Aftermath
Brooke would retain the seat at the 1979 general election, and hold it until his retirement at the 2001 general election (it reverted to its former name of Cities of London and Westminster in 1997). He held a number of front-bench Government posts during his tenure, including Secretary of State for Northern Ireland.

Results

The results for the previous election were:

See also
United Kingdom by-election records

References 

City of London and Westminster South by-election
City of London and Westminster South,1977
City of London and Westminster South,1977
City of London and Westminster South,1977
City of London and Westminster South by-election
City of London and Westminster South by-election
1970s in the City of Westminster